The 2020–21 season was Brighton & Hove Albion's 119th year in existence and their fourth consecutive season in the Premier League. Along with competing in the domestic league, the club also participated in the FA Cup and EFL Cup. The season covered the period from 27 July 2020 to 30 June 2021.

Summary 

The Seagulls had only two pre-season matches for the 2020–21 campaign due the late season start as the result of the previous season being delayed due to COVID-19. Brighton played out two home draws, 1–1 against Chelsea with Pascal Groß scoring a 90th-minute equaliser from the spot - with 2,500 fans attending for a government trial for fans return to football - and a 0–0 with West Brom.

Brighton's opening game of the season was at home to Chelsea on Monday 14 September 2020. The game finished in a 3–1 defeat for The Seagulls. Ben White made his first league appearance for Brighton and Adam Lallana made his debut in this game. Brighton's first win came in their second game, a 4–0 victory over Portsmouth in the EFL Cup on the 17 September where Alexis Mac Allister, Bernardo and Viktor Gyökeres all scored their first Albion goals. The Seagulls first league victory came in their second Premier League match, a 3–0 away win over Newcastle on 20 September in a game where Yves Bissouma received his first red card for the club. On 26 September, Bruno Fernandes scored a penalty for Manchester United after the final whistle due to VAR giving handball on Neal Maupay right at the end. The converted penalty gave United the 3 points, winning 3–2. 4 days later Brigton again lost to United this time a 3–0 home loss in the EFL Cup missing out on a quarter final place. Brighton claimed their first ever Premier League points against the defending champions Liverpool in a 1–1 home draw on 28 November, where Pascal Groß scored a 93rd-minute penalty to equalise, their second penalty of the game following Neal Maupay failing to convert the first awarded in the 20th minute.

On 10 January 2021, Brighton struggled against in form League Two side Newport County in their FA Cup third round side in which they scrapped a penalty shootout win away from home, in a match where Percy Tau eventually made his debut, 905 days after signing for the club. Neal Maupay's strike away at Leeds United on 16 January was enough to end The Albion's record of 9 game winless run in the top flight – 10 including their FA Cup fixture – taking all three points to the south coast.

Brighton's first home league win of the season came on their 11th match, keeping a clean sheet in a 1–0 win over Tottenham Hotspur on 31 January with Leandro Trossard netting the goal. This was their first home win in the league since 20 June 2020, a 2–1 victory over Arsenal. 3 days after the victory over Spurs, The Seagulls beat defending champions Liverpool at Anfield, their first League win at Liverpool since 1982 with Steven Alzate's first ever Premier League goal being the only goal of the game.

Brighton were smashed out of the FA Cup in the 94th minute with a headed goal for Kelechi Iheanacho in the 1–0 away loss at Leicester City on 10 February. Potter handed debuts to Poles, Jakub Moder and Michał Karbownik in the fifth round defeat.

On 22 February, Christian Benteke scored a 95th-minute winner to claim all 3 points against their biggest rivals taking Crystal Palace to 13th in the table after the 2–1 victory in Sussex. Joël Veltman scored his first goal for The Seagulls in the game. 5 days later, a controversial 1–0 defeat away at West Brom followed, Lewis Dunk had a goal ruled out by referee Lee Mason, causing strong criticism of Mason in the media and on Sky Sports, after blowing his whistle allowing a quick free-kick to be taken, however Mason then blew his whistle again after the free kick had been taken, denying Dunk the goal. Meanwhile, Pascal Groß and Danny Welbeck both missed from the penalty spot in the bizarre defeat at The Hawthorns.

On 20 March, Brighton matched their away meeting with Newcastle again beating The Magpies 3–0, going six points clear of the bottom three. On 20 April, Brighton earnt their first ever point at Stamford Bridge keeping a clean sheet in the 0–0 draw with Chelsea on a night The Blues withdrew from the controversary plans of the European Super League. Albion's Ben White was sent off in the 90+2 minute for a second bookable offense after putting in a strong performance throughout the game. 4 days later, Brighton lost to already relegated Sheffield United 1–0 at Bramall Lane with David McGoldrick scoring the only goal of the game. José Izquierdo came on as a substitute in his first first team appearance in 2–and–a–half years after being out with injuries.

On 9 May, in a 2–1 away loss at Wolves, Brighton had two players sent off. Lewis Dunk being dismissed first for pulling back Fábio Silva who was darting for goal, with Neal Maupay being shown red after confronting the referee, Jonathan Moss after the final whistle. A day later, Brighton's Premier League status was confirmed for a fifth consecutive season as a result of Burnley beaten Fulham 2–0 at Craven Cottage. The result actually knocked The Seagulls a place down to 16th on the night. On 18 May, in front of a reduced returning fan base, Brighton came from two goals down to beat this year's Premier League champions Manchester City. Their first win over the Cityzens since 1989. This was also Albion's first Premier League victory without captain Lewis Dunk, who was out suspended with Pascal Groß deputising in a game where Dan Burn – who scored the winner – scored his first Albion goal, and his first goal in over three years.

Brighton finished the season with a 2–0 away defeat at Arsenal and finishing the season in 16th place, equalling their best ever points tally of 41 points which was also achieved the season before. Brighton recorded their most goals scored in a Premier League season, scoring 40 and conceded 46, the fewest they have conceded. Their –6 goal difference is the best they achieved since being in the Premier League, with 12 clean sheets also being a club record.

It was a successful summer for Brighton with several players being called up by their countries for the delayed UEFA Euro 2020 tournament, taken place in the summer of 2021 due to Coronavirus. Leandro Trossard for Belgium, Robert Sánchez for Spain, Joël Veltman for the Netherlands and Jakub Moder for Poland all in their respective national squads for the championships. Ben White who gained his first international call-up with England was named in their 33-man provisional squad but was later one of seven players cut. Andi Zeqiri was also called up for the first time by his national side Switzerland, being named in the 29-man provisional squad, but like White, was cut from the squad. However, White made his national debut in the first warm up match against Austria where he came on as a substitute in the 1–0 victory at the Riverside Stadium where he blocked a shot on the line in the final stages. He became the fifth Brighton player to play for England, and the second in just under three years after captain Lewis Dunk won a cap in November 2018. In the second and final warm up match he made his first international start, playing the whole match in the 1–0 win over Romania again being played at the Riverside Stadium. A day later, on 7 June, he was called up to the 26-man squad to replace the injured Trent Alexander-Arnold who picked up an injury against Austria.

Players

First-team squad

Under 23s and academy

Players to have featured in a first-team matchday squad this season.

Transfers

Transfers in

Loans in

Loans out

Transfers out

Pre–season friendlies

Competitions

Premier League

League table

Results summary

Results by matchday

Matches
The 2020–21 season fixtures were released on 20 August.

FA Cup

EFL Cup

Squad statistics

|-
! colspan=14 style=background:#dcdcdc; text-align:center|Goalkeepers
                                                                                                                                             

|-
! colspan=14 style=background:#dcdcdc; text-align:center|Defenders

|-
! colspan=14   style=background:#dcdcdc; text-align:center|Midfielders                 

  

|-
! colspan=14 style=background:#dcdcdc; text-align:center|Forwards

 
 

|-
! colspan=17 style=background:#dcdcdc; text-align:center| Players who left the club permanently or on loan during the season 

|}

Note

• Dale Stephens joined Burnley on 24 September on a permanent transfer.

• Viktor Gyökeres joined Swansea City on 2 October on a season–long loan deal.

• Alex Cochrane joined Union SG on 5 October on a season–long loan deal.

• Haydon Roberts joined Rochdale on 16 October on a season–long loan deal.

• Jayson Molumby joined Preston North End on 5 January on loan for the remainder of the season.

• Bernardo joined Red Bull Salzburg on 19 January on a loan deal until the end of the season.

• Maty Ryan joined Arsenal on 22 January on loan until the end of the season.

• Max Sanders joined Lincoln City on 1 February on a permanent transfer.

References

Brighton & Hove Albion F.C. seasons
Brighton and Hove Albion